Dora Grace Mary Zatte has been the Ombudsman of the Seychelles since 15 February 2010.

She was educated at the University of East Anglia (LLB, 1997), and is a Barrister of Middle Temple. She is an Attorney-at-Law and Notary and previously served as a State Counsel.

She was appointed National Human Rights Commission Chairperson in 2014.

References

Year of birth missing (living people)
Living people
Alumni of the University of East Anglia
Members of the Middle Temple
Seychellois lawyers